BioMart is a community-driven project to provide a single point of access to distributed research data. The BioMart project contributes open source software and data services to the international scientific community. Although the BioMart software is primarily used by the biomedical research community, it is designed in such a way that any type of data can be incorporated into the BioMart framework. The BioMart project originated at the European Bioinformatics Institute as a data management solution for the Human Genome Project. Since then, BioMart has grown to become a multi-institute collaboration involving various database projects on five continents.

Software 
BioMart is a freely available, open-source, federated database system that provides unified access to disparate, geographically distributed data sources. BioMart allows databases hosted on different servers to be presented seamlessly to users, facilitating collaborative projects. BioMart contains several levels of query optimization to efficiently manage large data sets, and offers a diverse selection of graphical user interfaces and application programming interfaces to allow queries to be performed in whatever manner is most convenient for the user. BioMart's capabilities are extended by integration with several widely used software packages such as Bioconductor, Galaxy, Cytoscape, and Taverna.

Data sources and community 
There are around 40 BioMart data sources including the Atlas of UTR Regulatory Activity (AURA), the COSMIC cancer database, Ensembl Genomes, HapMap, InterPro, Mouse Genome Informatics (MGI), Rfam and UniProt. Access is provided by institutions including the European Bioinformatics Institute (EBI) and the Wellcome Trust Sanger Institute in the UK, Cold Spring Harbor Laboratory and the National Center for Biotechnology Information (NCBI) in the United States and French National Centre for Scientific Research (CNRS). The BioMart Central Portal was established to provide a convenient single point of access to this growing pool of data sources.

References

External links 
DATABASE Issue dedicated to BioMart
 NATURE METHODS "Quantitative data: learning to share" featuring BioMart
 BioMart Project home page
 BioMart Users mailing list

Bioinformatics software
Biological databases
Data warehousing products
Free software projects
Science and technology in Cambridgeshire
South Cambridgeshire District